Monika Weber-Koszto (born 7 February 1966) is a Romanian-born German fencer. She won a silver medal in the women's team foil event at the 1984 Summer Olympics competing for Romania. She then won a silver in the same event at the 1992 Summer Olympics competing for Germany. She went on to win two more bronze medals in the same event for Germany at the 1996 and 2000 Summer Olympics.

References

External links
 

1966 births
Living people
Romanian female foil fencers
German female foil fencers
Olympic fencers of Romania
Olympic fencers of Germany
Fencers at the 1984 Summer Olympics
Fencers at the 1992 Summer Olympics
Fencers at the 1996 Summer Olympics
Fencers at the 2000 Summer Olympics
Olympic silver medalists for Romania
Olympic silver medalists for Germany
Olympic bronze medalists for Germany
Olympic medalists in fencing
Sportspeople from Satu Mare
Medalists at the 1984 Summer Olympics
Medalists at the 1992 Summer Olympics
Medalists at the 1996 Summer Olympics
Medalists at the 2000 Summer Olympics